Ovey Comeaux High School is a public school located in Lafayette, Louisiana, United States.

Student activities

The school offers one of the top FFA programs in the State, a Speech Squad,  NJROTC,  Science Club, French Club, Spanish Club, Art Club, Cheerleading, Beta Club, Key Club, Robotics (FRC, FTC, and VEX),  and a band.

Athletics
Comeaux High athletics competes in the LHSAA.

Sporting programs include: Marching Band, Wrestling, Track, Soccer, Football, Basketball, Baseball, Softball, Volleyball, Golf, Tennis, Cross Country, and Swimming.

Feeder schools
Broussard Middle School, Youngsville Middle School, Milton Middle School, and Paul Breaux Middle School all act as feeder schools for Comeaux High School.

Comeaux provides secondary education to the southern portion of Lafayette Parish.

Notable alumni
Brandon Stokley, former wide receiver for the Denver Broncos and Baltimore Ravens
Lance Lantier, former Executive Officer and Commanding Officer, USS RENTZ (FFG 46), and featured on the program "Drug Wars" Season 1 on Fusion TV

References

External links
  Comeaux High School's Official Site

 Comeaux High School Band's Official Site

Public high schools in Louisiana
Schools in Lafayette, Louisiana